The Midia South East field is a Romanian oil field that was discovered in 2001 and located on the continental shelf of the Black Sea. It will begin production in 2020 and will produce oil and natural gas.

References

Black Sea energy
Oil fields in Romania